Chen Xuesi (born December 1959) is a Chinese chemist and researcher at the Key Laboratory of Polymer Ecomaterials, Chinese Academy of Sciences (CAS).

Early life and education
Chen was born in Changchun, Jilin in December 1959. In July 1982 he graduated from Jilin University, where he obtained a Bachelor of Science degree. In September 1988 he studied, then taught at the Changchun Institute of Applied Chemistry, Chinese Academy of Sciences (CAS). In October 1993 he pursued advanced studies in Japan, earning a doctor degree in engineering from Waseda University in March 1997. He was a postdoc at the University of Pennsylvania from April 1997 to May 1999.

Career
He returned to China in June 1996, and that year became research associate at the Changchun Institute of Applied Chemistry, Chinese Academy of Sciences (CAS). He was promoted to researcher in December 1999.

Honours and awards
 2004 Distinguished Young Scholar by the National Science Fund
 November 22, 2019 Academician of the Chinese Academy of Sciences (CAS)

References

External links
 Chen Xuesi on the Key Laboratory of Polymer Ecomaterials, Chinese Academy of Sciences 

1959 births
People from Changchun
Living people
Jilin University alumni
Waseda University alumni
University of Pennsylvania alumni
Chemists from Jilin
Members of the Chinese Academy of Sciences